Aldeanueva de la Vera is a municipality located in the province of Cáceres, Extremadura, western Spain.

Aldeanueva the la Vera is situated in the Sierra de Gredos. It has a predominantly agricultural economy, producing  tobacco, figs, cherries, red pepper powder (pimenton la casareña) and the regional wine "pitarra".

References

Municipalities in the Province of Cáceres